The Ponte Molino is a Roman bridge across the Bacchiglione in Padua, Italy. The span-to-rise ratio of the Late Republican bridge varies between 3.5–4.5 and 1, the ratio of clear span and pier thickness between 4–6.5 and 1.

Apart from the Ponte Molino, there are other extant Roman bridges in Padua: Ponte San Lorenzo, Ponte Altinate and Ponte Corbo, all three also featuring segmented arches, as well as Ponte S. Matteo.

See also 
 List of Roman bridges
 Roman architecture
 Roman engineering

References

Sources

External links 

Roman bridges in Italy
Roman segmental arch bridges
Deck arch bridges
Stone bridges in Italy
Bridges in Padua
Bridges completed in the 1st century BC
Tourist attractions in Veneto
Transport in Veneto